Inula is a genus of about 80 species of flowering plants in the family Asteraceae, native to Europe, Asia and Africa.

They carry yellow daisy-like composite flowerheads often with narrow ray-florets.

Some common characteristics include pappus with bristles, flat capitulum, and lack of chaff.

Several species are popular flowers for the garden, with cultivation going back to antiquity. The smaller species are used in rock gardens and the more common larger ones, which tend to have very coarse foliage, in borders.

Etymology 

The genus name Inula is of uncertain origin, and was already in use by the Romans. The Latin phrase inula campana (field inula) gave rise to the English  whose scientific name is Inula helenium. The plant's specific name, helenium, derives from Helen of Troy; elecampane is said to have sprung up from where her tears fell.

Species 
The following species are recognised in the genus Inula:

Select species formerly in Inula
 Inula auriculata Boiss. & Balansa => Pentanema auriculatum (Boiss. & Balansa) D.Gut.Larr. et al.
 Inula britannica L. => Pentanema britannica (L.) D.Gut.Larr.et al. – British yellowhead
 Inula conyzae (Griess.) Meikle =>  Pentanema squarrosum (L.) D.Gut.Larr.et al. – ploughman's-spikenard
 Inula crithmoides L. => Limbarda crithmoides (L.) Dumort. – golden samphire
 Inula dysenterica L. => Pulicaria dysenterica (L.) Bernh.
 Inula graminifolia Michx. => Pityopsis graminifolia (Michx.) Nutt.
 Inula graveolens (L.) Desf. => Dittrichia graveolens (L.) Greuter – stinkwort, stinkweed
 Inula hirta L. => Pentanema hirtum (L.)  D.Gut.Larr. et al.
 Inula indica L. => Pentanema indicum (L.) Y.Ling
 Inula mariana L. => Chrysopsis mariana (L.) Elliott
 Inula orientalis Lam. => Pentanema orientale (Lam.) D.Gut.Larr.et al.
 Inula primulifolia Lam. => Conyza primulifolia (Lam.) Cuatrec. & Lourteig
 Inula salicina L. => Pentanema salicinum (L.) D.Gut.Larr.et al. – Irish fleabane, willowleaf yellowhead
 Inula spiraeifolia L. => Pentanema spiraeifolium (L.) D.Gut.Larr.et al.
 Inula subaxillaris Lam. => Heterotheca subaxillaris (Lam.) Britton & Rusby
 Inula viscosa => Dittrichia viscosa – false yellowhead, sticky fleabane, woody fleabane

Ecology
Inula species are used as food plants by the larvae of some Lepidoptera species including case-bearers of the genus Coleophora, such as C. conyzae (recorded on I. conyzae), C. follicularis, C. inulae, and C. troglodytella.

Gallery

References

External links

Flora Europaea: Inula
Flora of China: list of Chinese Inula species

 
Asteraceae genera